Francis James was an Australian publisher and eccentric, imprisoned as a spy.

Francis James may also refer to:
Francis James (congressman) (1799–1886), U.S. Representative from Pennsylvania
Francis James (missionary) (1851–1900), British Christian missionary in China
Francis James (MP), MP for Dorchester

See also

Frank James (disambiguation)
Frances James (disambiguation)
James Francis (disambiguation)